General Sullivan may refer to:

Brad M. Sullivan (fl. 1990s–2020s), U.S. Air Force major general
Dennis B. Sullivan (1927–2020), U.S. Air Force brigadier general
Gordon R. Sullivan (born 1937), U.S. Army general
Jeremiah C. Sullivan (1830–1890), Union Army brigadier general
John Sullivan (general) (1740–1795), Continental Army major general
Thomas Crook Sullivan (1833–1908), U.S. Army brigadier general

See also
Attorney General Sullivan (disambiguation)